Baker Dam may refer to:

 Lower Baker Dam, in Skagit County, Washington state, constructed in 1926
 Upper Baker Dam, completed in 1959 and forming a reservoir called Baker Lake
 Several proposed dams across the Baker River (Chile) in Patagonia within the HidroAysén project